Urban Andrain Woodbury (July 11, 1838 – April 15, 1915) was an American Civil War veteran, an entrepreneur and a U.S. politician of the Republican Party. He served as mayor of Burlington, 37th lieutenant governor, and as the 45th governor of Vermont.

Prewar life 
Woodbury was born in Acworth, New Hampshire, on July 11, 1838, the son of Albert M. and Lucy L. (Wadleigh) Woodbury, natives of Cavendish, Vermont. He was raised in Morristown and Morrisville, Vermont from the age of two, and attended the public schools of Morristown, and Peoples Academy in Morrisville.  Woodbury intended on a career as a physician and attended the medical department of the University of Vermont, from which he graduated in 1859.  He never practiced medicine because he decided to enlist in the Union Army for the American Civil War.

Civil War 
Woodbury enlisted on May 25, 1861, and mustered in as 1st Sergeant of Company H, 2nd Vermont Infantry on June 20.  He fought at the July 21 First Battle of Bull Run, where he lost his right arm after being struck by a fragment from an exploding artillery shell, thus becoming Vermont's first Empty Sleeve.  Woodbury was captured, and after nearly three months in prison in Richmond, Virginia, he was paroled on October 5, 1861.  He was discharged on account of wounds on October 18.

In November 1862, Woodbury accepted a commission as a captain and was assigned as commander of Company D, 11th Vermont Infantry.  He transferred to the Veteran Reserve Corps on June 17, 1863, and resigned from the service March 27, 1865.

Postwar life 

After returning from the war, Woodbury settled in Burlington and engaged in the lumber and hotel businesses.  For 19 years he was manager of the Booth Lumber Company of Burlington, and for 35 years owner and proprietor of the Van Ness House, a hotel he enlarged twice, enabling it to accommodate 400 guests.  At the time of his death he was president of the Mead Manufacturing Company, the Crystal Confectionery Company, and the Queen City Cotton Company.

A Republican, he was elected alderman in Burlington's 2nd Ward in 1881 and 1882, and he was president of the board in his second year.  From 1884 to 1886, he served as a colonel on the staff of Governor John L. Barstow. He was mayor of Burlington in 1885 and 1886, and lieutenant governor from 1888 to 1890, under Governor William P. Dillingham.  He served as governor from 1894 to 1896.  In 1898, he was appointed by President William McKinley to a commission led by General Grenville Dodge, which investigated the conduct of the War Department in the Spanish–American War.

Woodbury was active in Freemasonry and attained the 32nd degree of the Scottish Rite.  His other fraternal associations included Freemasonry, IOOF, Grand Army of the Republic, Military Order of the Loyal Legion of the United States, Sons of the American Revolution, and Knights of Pythias.  Woodbury was also an early member of the Green Mountain Club which was established at a meeting in the Van Ness House in 1910.

Death and burial
Woodbury became ill in early 1915, and in February he traveled to the Battle Creek Sanitarium in Michigan to seek a cure.  He suffered several strokes soon after beginning a course of treatment, and after it was clear he would not recover, Woodbury asked to be brought back to Burlington so he could pass his final days at his own home.  He died in Burlington on April 15, 1915.  Woodbury was buried at Lakeview Cemetery in Burlington.

Family
On February 12, 1860, Woodbury married Paulina L. Darling, daughter of Ira and Sarah Darling of Elmore, Vermont.  They were the parents of six children: Charles, Minnie, Gertrude, Edward, Lila, and Mildred. Gertrude Woodbury (1872-1962) was the wife of George M. Powers, who served as an associate justice of the Vermont Supreme Court.

References

Sources 
 Benedict, G. G., Vermont in the Civil War. A History of the part taken by the Vermont Soldiers And Sailors in the War For The Union, 1861–65, Burlington, VT: The Free Press Association, 1888, i:77, 83; ii:343.
 "Ex-Gov. U. A. Woodbury Prominently Identified With Business Interests of Burlington," Bennington (VT) Banner, April 17, 1915
 "Last Honors Paid, Funeral of the Late Governor Woodbury Held Sunday," Bennington (VT) Banner, April 20, 1915
 Peck, Theodore S., compiler, Revised Roster of Vermont Volunteers and lists of Vermonters Who Served in the Army and Navy of the United States During the War of the Rebellion, 1861–66. Montpelier, VT.: Press of the Watchman Publishing Co., 1892, pp. 56, 424, 733.
Urban Andrain Woodbury at National Governors Association

See also 
 Vermont in the Civil War

|-

|-

|-

|-

|-

1838 births
1915 deaths
People from Acworth, New Hampshire
Republican Party governors of Vermont
Mayors of Burlington, Vermont
People of Vermont in the American Civil War
American Civil War prisoners of war
Sons of the American Revolution
University of Vermont alumni
Vermont Brigade
19th-century American politicians
General Society of Colonial Wars
Burials at Lakeview Cemetery (Burlington, Vermont)
Lieutenant Governors of Vermont
American amputees